The Global AIDS Coordinator at the United States Department of State is the official responsible for overseeing U.S.-sponsored humanitarian aid programs to combat the AIDS epidemic around the world. The Global AIDS Coordinator has the rank of Ambassador-at-Large and Assistant Secretary.

Mission 
The mission of the Office of the U.S. Global AIDS Coordinator and Health Diplomacy (OGAC) is to lead the implementation of the U.S. President's Emergency Plan For AIDS Relief (PEPFAR), the largest commitment ever by any nation for an international health initiative dedicated to a single disease. Initiated in 2003, PEPFAR has been reauthorized three times. What began as an emergency response has since developed into one of the largest international health initiatives. PEPFAR has supported countries in the development of national health and information systems to support the fight of HIV/AIDS and other diseases, and is collaborating with countries around the world to work towards epidemic control. PEPFAR aid has directly contributed to preventing over 20 million excess deaths in 50 countries around the world, as of June 2021.

OGAC is also one of the few offices at the State Department that reports directly to the Secretary of State, instead of going through a Deputy Secretary of State.

List of Global AIDS Coordinators

Notes

External links
 Official website

HIV/AIDS
 
 
Health policy in the United States